Xenophon of Ephesus (fl. 2nd century – 3rd century AD) was a Greek writer.  His surviving work is the Ephesian Tale of Anthia and Habrocomes, one of the earliest novels as well as one of the sources for Shakespeare's Romeo and Juliet.  

He is not to be confused with the earlier and more famous Athenian soldier and historian,  Xenophon of Athens.

References

More Reading
Xenophon of Ephesus’ Critique of Stoic Thinking about Slavery

Ancient Greek novelists
Ancient Ephesians
Year of birth unknown
Year of death unknown